The United Kingdom Akkreditering Forum (UKAF), founded in June 1998 by a group of leading healthcare accreditation organisations, is a London-based network of healthcare accreditation organisations formed with the intention of sharing experience regarding good practice in accreditation, as well as sharing new ideas around improving the methodology for such programmes. It has an additional role in working to ensure that the general public develop a clearer idea about accreditation, its function, its implications and its execution. 

The aim of UKAF is to provide an effective network of organisations which operate or have a practical interest in developing standards-based assessment and accreditation programmes in healthcare.

The group meets quarterly, and is self-funding through annual organisational membership subscriptions.

Remit

 cataloguing programmes and defining their products, both to users and to the general public
 encouraging the sharing of core developments between programmes
 mutual peer review of accreditation programmes
 exploration of the peer review techniques
 the recruitment, training, monitoring and evaluation of surveyors
 the mechanisms for awards of accredited status to organizations
 developing healthcare quality standards
 the implementation of standards within healthcare organizations
 self-regulation: to seek voluntary convergence of standards and of the operation of the assessment process
 to provide a mechanism for accreditation bodies to communicate with each other and, collectively, with others such as government departments, professional colleges and national associations, and commissioning, funding and insurance agencies

Member accreditation schemes

Members of UKAF include:
Accreditation for Acute Inpatient Mental Health Services (AIMS)
Accreditation of Library and Information Services in the Health Sector
Autism Accreditation 
Better Services for People who Self-harm
Child Health Informatics Centre (CHIC)
CHKS Healthcare Accreditation and Quality Unit
Clinical Pathology Accreditation (UK) Ltd. (CPA) 
Community of Communities
Electroconvulsive Therapy Accreditation Service (ECTAS)
Health Promoting Hospitals and Trusts
The Prescribing Observatory for Mental Health–UK (POMH-UK)
QHA Trent Accreditation
Quality Network for Forensic Mental Health Services
Quality Improvement Network for Multi-agency Child and Adolescent Mental Health Services
Quality Network for In-Patient Child and Adolescent Mental Health Services (QNIC)
RDB Star Rating Ltd (Residential and Domiciliary Care Benchmarking)

See also
International healthcare accreditation
List of international healthcare accreditation organizations
Hospital accreditation
Accreditation
Medical ethics
Clinical governance

References

Quality assurance
Medical and health organisations based in the United Kingdom
Accreditation in healthcare